Meril Prothom Alo Awards or Prothom Alo Awards is an annual Bangladeshi awards ceremony honouring cinematic achievements in Bangladeshi Film Industry. The awards are divided into two components, Viewers' Choice and Critics' Choice. The awards were first presented in 1998 and since then the awards are given every year at the Bangabandhu International Conference Center (BICC).

The 19th Meril Prothom Alo Awards ceremony was held on 20 April 2017 at Bangabandhu International Conference Center. Meril Prothom Alo Awards receive the highest number of viewers among Bangladesh's Awards Ceremonies. Meril Prothom Alo Awards are Bangladesh's equivalent to America's Academy Awards.

History
Meril Prothom Alo Awards were first awarded in 1998. The awards ceremony was organised and held by Bangladesh's largest newspaper Daily Prothom Alo and Square Toiletries Limited. After the construction of BICC in 2002, the awards ceremony was moved to a new location and in 2002, the awards ceremony for the first time was held in front of a large audience. The awards include nominations in more than 30 categories and 2 honorary awards (includes lifetime achievements award).

Nomination
Meril Prothom Alo Awards is divided into two different nomination processes, the Viewers Choice Awards nominations are made based on votes received from audiences and viewers while the jury nominations are selected by the board members (consist of veteran Bangladeshi directors, actors, actresses and producers, and other film personalities).

Voters
The Meril Prothom Alo Awards (MPAA) committee, consists of several selected members' votes on selecting the nominees for each award category. All voters have to be certified by The Prothom Alo Corporation. After the nominees are shortlisted, the nominations are made available to public and they can vote for any of the nominees.

Board members
The board members (known as the Juries) decide the nominations and winners of Critics Choice Awards, which also include honorary awards. The Critics Choice Awards are given in 10 categories. The board, often consists of 8–10 members.

 1999
 Best Movie Actor - Male
  Movie Actor - Male 
 Manna - (Ammajan)
 Riaz 
 Ferdous
 Best Movie Actor - Female 
 Shabnur (Ei Mon Tomake Dilam)
 Moushumi
 Poppy
 Best Singer - Male 
 Andrew Kishore (Brindamon)
 Ayub Bacchu 
 Tapan Chowdhury 
 Best Singer - Female 
 Kanak Chapa (Eto Shundor Prithibi)
 Runa Laila 
 Sabina Yasmin
 Best Model - Male
 Nobel (TVC)
 Pollob
 Shimul
 Best Model - Female 
 Sadia Islam Mou (TVC)
 Tarin
 Riya
 Best TV Commercial
 Keya Super Lemon Soap
 Berger Paints
 Meril Beauty Care Soap
 Best Magazine TV Show 
 Ityadi (Hanif Sanket)
 Flop Show
 Shubheccha
 Best Music Band 
 LRB
 Ark
 Nagar Baul
 Best TV Actor - Female
 Bipasha Hayat
 Shomy Kayser
 Afsana Mimi
 Best TV Actor - Male 
 Zahid Hasan
 Azizul Hakim
 Tauquir Ahmed
 Best TV Natok Story 
 Abul Hayat (Unmesh)
 Giasuddin Selim (Dokkhiner Ghor)
 Panna Kayser (Kahini)
 Masum Aziz (Ontore Nirontor)
 Best TV Natok Director 
 Syedul Anam Tutul (Dokkiner Ghor)
 Abul Hayat (Unmesh)
 Sheikh Niyamat Ali (Vorer Kotha Mala)
 Best TV Natok Actor - Male
 Masud Ali Khan (Vorer Kotha Mala)
 Shahiduzzaman Selim (Adhuli)
 Jayanto Chattopadhyay (Dokkhiner Ghor)
 Best TV Natok Actor - Female
 Rokeya Prachi (Chor)
 Tania Ahmed (Dokkhiner Ghor)
 Natasha Hayat (Unmesh)
 2000

Best Movie Actor - Male
Manna (Abbajan)
Riaz
Ferdous
Best Movie Actor - Female
Shabnur (Mrittu Geet Shomriddho)
Poppy
Moushumi
Best Model - Female
Sadia Islam Mou (Apon Jewellers TVC)
Riya
Tarin
Best Model - Male
Nobel (TVC)
Pollob
Shahed
Best Magazine TV Show
Ityadi (Hanif Sanket)
Shubeccha
Aajkaal
Best TV Actor - Female
Shomy Kayser 
Afsana Mimi
Bipasha Hayat
Best TV Actor - Male
Zahid Hasan
Azizul Hakim
Tauquir Ahmed
 2001
 Best Singer - Male
 Asif Akbar (O Priya Tumi Kothay)
 Andrew Kishore (Poddo Patar Pani)
 Jens Sumon (Ekta Chador Hobe)
 Hasan (Taal)
 Best Singer - Female
 Kanak Chapa (Shagorer Moto Gobhir)
 Kaniz Suborna (Bhalobashi Tomake)
 Momtaz (Return Ticket)
 Samina Chowdhury (Shaat Bhai Chompa)
 Best Model - Male
 Noble (Keya TVC)
 James (Pepsi TVC)
 Shimul (Berger TVC)
 Shahed (Lubaba TVC)
 Best Model - Female
 Sadia Islam Mou (Keya Herbal TVC)
 Aupee Karim (Lux TVC)
 Purnima (Lux TVC)
 Riya (Renus Jewellers TVC)
 Best Movie Actor - Male
 Riaz (Shoshurbari Zindabad)
 Mahfuz (Dui Duari)
 Manna (Abbajan)
 Ferdous
 Best Movie Actor - Female
 Shabnur (Shoshrbari Zindabad)
 Meher Afroze Shaon (Dui Duari)
 Purnima
 Moushumi
 Best Band
 LRB (Mon Chaile Mon Pabe)
 Ark (Brihoshpoti)
 Baul Nogor (Dushtu Cheler Dol)
 Promithius (Shoreo Shoreya)
 Best Magazine TV Show
 Ittadi (Hanif Sanket)
 Poriprekkhon
 Bolte Chai
 Shubheccha
 Best TV Actor - Male
 Zahid Hasan
 Azizul Hakim
 Afzal Hossain
 Tauquir Ahmed
 Best TV Actor - Female
 Shomi Kayser
 Tarin
 Afsana Mimi
 Bipasha Hayat

Awards

Public Choice Awards

 Best Male Singer
 Best Female Singer
 Best TV Actor
 Best TV Actress
 Best Film Actor
 Best Film Actress
 Best Newcomer (Film and Television)
 Best Musical Band
 Best Male Model
 Best Female Model

{| class="wikitable"
|-
! style="background:#EEDD82;"|Best Film Actor
! style="background:#EEDD82;"|Best TV Actor
|-
| valign="top" |
 1998 - Riaz
 1999 -Manna
 2000 -Manna
 2001 -Riaz (Shoshurbari Zindabad)
 2002 -Riaz (O Priya Tumi Kothay)
 2003 -Riaz (Moner Majhe Tumi)
 2004 -Ferdous (Bachelor)
 2005 -ATM Shamsuzzaman (Molla Barir Bou)
 2006 -Riaz (Hridoyer Kotha)
 2007 - Chanchal Chowdhury
 2008 - Shakib Khan (Priya Amar Priya)
 2009 - Chanchal Chowdhury (Monpura)
 2010 -Shakib Khan (Bhalobaslei Ghor Bandha Jay Na)
 2011 - Shakib Khan ( King Khan)
 2012 - Shakib Khan (Don Number One)
 2013 - Shakib Khan (Purno Doirgho Prem Kahini)
 2014 - Shakib Khan (Hero: The Superstar)
 2015 - Arifin Shuvoo (Chuye Dile Mon)
 2016 - Shakib Khan ( Shikari)
 2017 -
 2018 -Atikur Rahman Mahi(Mahi)
 2019 -
| valign="top" |
 1998 – Zahid Hasan
 1999 – Zahid Hasan
 2000 – Zahid Hasan
 2001 – Zahid Hasan (Nilanjana)
 2002 – Zahid Hasan (Bandhan)
 2003 – Mahfuz Ahmed
 2004 – Mahfuz Ahmed (Nurul Huda Ekoda Valobeshechilo)
 2005 – Mahfuz Ahmed (Otopor Nurul Huda)
 2006 – Mahfuz Ahmed (Otopor Nurul Huda)
 2007 – Zahid Hasan
 2008 – Mahfuz Ahmed (Amader Nurul Huda)
 2009 – Mosharraf Karim (Housefull)
 2010 – Zahid Hasan (Graduate)
 2011 – Mosharraf Karim (Chander Nijer Kono Alo Nei)
 2012 – Zahid Hasan (Arman Bhai Honeymoon e)
 2013 – Mosharraf Karim (Sikandar Box Ekhon Birat Model)
 2014 – Mosharraf Karim (Sei Rokom Pan-Khor)
 2015 – Mosharraf Karim – (Sikandar Box Ekhon Nijer Grame)
 2016 - Mosharraf Karim (Bougiri)
 2017 – Ziaul Faruq Apurba – (Boro Chele)
 2018 - Afran Nisho (Buker Ba Pashe)
 2019 - Afran Nisho
|-
! style="background:#EEDD82;"|Best Singer (Male)
! style="background:#EEDD82;"|Best Singer (Female)
|-
|
 1998 – Tapan Chowdhury
 1999 – Andrew Kishore
 2000 – Andrew Kishore
 2001 – Asif Akbar (O Priya Tumi Kothay)
 2002 – Asif Akbar
 2003 – Asif Akbar
 2004 – Asif Akbar
 2005 – Asif Akbar (Bachbo Na)
 2006 – Habib Wahid (Bhalobashbo Bashbore – Hridoyer Kotha)
 2007 – Balam (Balam)
 2008 – Habib Wahid (Bolchi Tomake)
 2009 – Habib Wahid (Dwidha – Third Person Singular Number)
 2010 – Habib Wahid (Projapoti – Projapoti)
 2011 – Arfin Rumey (Nilanjona)
 2012 – Habib Wahid (Shadin)
 2013 – Asif Akbar (Ex-Prem)
 2014 – Tahsan Rahman Khan
 2015 – Tahsan Rahman Khan (Chuye Dile Mon – Chuye Dile Mon)
|
 1998 – Kanak Chapa
 1999 – Kanak Chapa
 2000 – Kanak Chapa
 2001 – Kanak Chapa
 2002 – Kanak Chapa
 2003 – Momtaz Begum
 2004 – Dolly Shantoni
 2005 – Samina Chowdhury (Ei Bujhi Tumi Ele)
 2006 – Samina Chowdhury (Amar Majhe Nei – Rani Kuthir Baki Itihash)
 2007 – Fahmida Nabi (Lukuchuri Lukuchuri Golpo – Aha!)
 2008 – Kazi Krishnokoli Islam (Jao Pakhi – Monpura)
 2009 – Nazmun Munira Nancy (Dwidha – Third Person Singular Number)
 2010 – Nazmun Munira Nancy (Shishir Bheja)
 2011 – Nazmun Munira Nancy (Pagol Tor Jonno)
 2012 – Nazmun Munira Nancy (Bhalobasi Tomay)
 2013 – Nazmun Munira Nancy (Akash Hote Chai)
 2014 – Nazmun Munira Nancy (Bhalo Na Basle Ki Bojha Jay)
 2015 – Nazmun Munira Nancy (Dana Kata Pori)
|-
! style="background:#EEDD82;"|Best Newcomer (Film and Television)
! style="background:#EEDD82;"|Best Musical Band
|-
|
 2014 – Tanjin Tisha (U-turn)
 2015 – Nusrat Faria Mazhar (Aashiqui)
 2016 – Shabnom Bubly (Bossgiri)
 2017 -Taskin Rahman (Dhaka Attack)
 2018 - Shabnam Fariya (Debi)
|
|-
! style="background:#EEDD82;"|Best Male Model
! style="background:#EEDD82;"|Best Female Model
|-
|
 1998 – Adil Hossain Nobel
 1999 – Adil Hossain Nobel
 2000 – Adil Hossain Nobel
 2001 – Adil Hossain Nobel
 2002 - Sabbir Ahmed
 2003 – Adil Hossain Nobel
 2004 – Adil Hossain Nobel
 2005 – Chanchal Chowdhury (Grameen Phone)
 2006 – Kazi Jamal Uddin (Asian City)
 2007 – Mamnun Hasan Emon (Banglalink Desh To Desh)
|
 1998 – Sadia Islam Mou
 1999 – Sadia Islam Mou
 2000 – Sadia Islam Mou
 2001 – Sadia Islam Mou
 2002 – Mozeza Ashraf Monalisa
 2003 – Nusrat Imroz Tisha
 2004 – Nusrat Imroz Tisha
 2005 – Prarthona Fardin Dighi (Grameen Phone – Moyna Pakhi)
 2006 – Prarthona Fardin Dighi (Elite Ranga Mehedi)
 2007 – Mozeza Ashraf Monalisa (Banglalink Desh To Desh)
|}

Critics' Choice Awards

Special awards
Meril-Prothom Alo Lifetime Achievement Award since 2002

 1998
 1999 –
 2000 –
 2001 –
 2002 –
 2003 – Ahmed Rubel (Adhiar); Best Producer: Saidul Anam Tutul (Adhiar); and Best Playwright: Mustafa Manwar
 2004 –
 2005 – Best Dancer: Shibli Muhammad; and Best Singer: Monir Khan
 2006 – Best Cinematography (TV): Monirul Islam Masud; Best Cinematography (Film): Maqsudul Bari; Best Dancer: Munmun Ahmed; and Best Singer: Kumar Bishwajit (Drishti Bhora Brishti)
 2007 – Fazlur Rahman Babu (Swopnodanay); Best Dancer: Shamim Ara Nipa; and Best Singer: Bappa Mazumder (Din Bari Jay)
 2008 – Best Film: SA Haque Alik (Akash Chhoa Bhalobasa); Best Dancer: Sharmila Bandopadhay; and Best Singer: Deepto (Ekti Sorol Onko)
 2009 – Topu (Third Person Singular Number)
 2010 –
 2011 – A.T.M. Shamsuzzaman (Guerilla)
 2012 – Mamun (Ghetuputra Kamola) and Meghla (Uttarer Sur)
 2013 –
 2014 – Best Director: Wahid Anam (Chinno); Best Make-up Artist: Mohammad Faruq (Brihonnola'')

Discontinued categories
Best TV Program

 1998 – Ittyadi
 1999 – Ittyadi
 2000 – Ittyadi
 2001 – Ittyadi
 2002 – Ittyadi
 2003 – Ittyadi
 2004 – Ittyadi
 2005 – Ittyadi

Records

Most awards 
 Shabnur- 10 (10 Popular Best Film Actress)
 Nusrat Imroz Tisha – 10 (6x Popular Best TV Actress, 1x Critics' Best Film Actress, 1x Critics' Best TV Actress, 2x Best Female Model)
 Mosharraf Karim – 9 (6x Popular Best TV Actor, 3x Critics' Best TV Actor)
 Riaz – 8 (5x Popular Best Film Actor, 3x Critics' Best Film Actor)
 Zahid Hasan – 8 (8x Popular Best TV Actor)
 Shakib Khan – 8 (7x Popular Best Film Actor, 1x Critics' Best Film Actor)

Most acting awards 
Male:
 Mosharraf Karim – 9 (6x Popular Best TV Actor, 3x Critics' Best TV Actor)
 Riaz – 8 (5x Popular Best Film Actor, 3x Critics' Best Film Actor)
 Zahid Hasan – 8 (8x Popular Best TV Actor)
 Shakib Khan – 8 (7x Popular Best Film Actor, 1x Critics' Best Film Actor)
Female:
 Shabnur – 10 ( 10 Popular Best Film Actress)
 Nusrat Imroz Tisha – 8 (6x Popular Best TV Actress, 1x Critics' Best Film Actress, 1x Critics' Best TV Actress)

Most music awards 
Male:
 Asif Akbar – 6 (6x Best Male Singer)
 Habib Wahid – 5 (5x Best Male Singer)
Female:
 Nancy – 7 (7x Best Female Singer)
 Kanak Chapa – 4 (4x Best Female Singer)

Most directing awards 
 Animesh Aich – 4 (4x Best TV Director)

Most film awards 
Male:
 Riaz – 8 (5x Popular Best Film Actor, 3x Critics' Best Film Actor)
 Shakib Khan – 8 (7x Popular Best Film Actor, 1x Critics' Best Film Actor)
Female:
 Shabnur – 10 (10 Popular Best Film Actress)

Most TV awards 
Male:
 Mosharraf Karim – 9 (6x Popular Best TV Actor, 3x Critics' Best TV Actor)
 Zahid Hasan – 8 (8x Popular Best TV Actor)

Female:
 Nusrat Imroz Tisha – 7 (6x Popular Best TV Actress, 1x Critics' Best TV Actress)

Most modelling awards 
Male:
 Adil Hossain Nobel – 6 (6x Best Male Model)
Female:
 Sadia Islam Mou – 4 (4x Best Female Model)

Most nominations
Female:
 Shabnur- 13 (for Best Popular Film Actress)

Awards ceremonies
The following is a listing of all Meril Prothom Alo Awards ceremonies since 1998.

Controversy
The awards have come under criticism from various sections of the society for being held during a time of national crisis. Ignoring public outcry on social networks, the organizers went ahead with the ceremony which was held at the Bangabandhu International Convention Centre in Dhaka on 26 April 2013, as the entire country mourned the demise of more than 1136 people in the collapse of a building at Savar.

See also
 National Film Awards (Bangladesh)
 Ifad Film Club Award
 Babisas Award
 Channel i Music Awards

References

External links
 Watch Meril Prothom-alo Taroka Awards online

 
Bangladeshi film awards
Awards established in 1998
1998 establishments in Bangladesh